= Warfield group =

Concept in algebra

In algebra, a Warfield group, studied by R. B. Warfield Jr. in 1972, is a summand of a simply presented abelian group.
